Orders, decorations, and medals of Ethiopia are awards of the government of Ethiopia which are typically issued for sustained meritorious service, whether it be in a civilian capacity or in their capacity in the Ethiopian National Defense Force. They are governed by the laws of Ethiopia on awards.

Ethiopian Empire and modern era 
During the socialist era in Ethiopia from 1974 to 1991, after the abolishment of the Empire and the institution of the Derg (later the People's Democratic Republic of Ethiopia), few Imperial Orders or Decorations were issued. During preparations for the return of the Ethiopian monarchy, and upon the death of Emperor Amha Selassie, the Crown Council now gained responsibility over Imperial Orders and Decorations. The following orders comprise all Imperial Honours sanctioned by the Crown Council of Ethiopia:

  
  
  
  
  
  
  
 Order of Emperor Haile Selassie I
 Order of the Ethiopian Lion

Military and Civil Decorations:

 Military Medal of Merit of the Order of St. George
 Distinguished Military Medal of Haile Selassie the First
 Gold Medal of Menelik II
 Gold Medal of Haile Selassie I
 Silver Medal of Menelik II
 Silver Medal of Haile Selassie I
 Lalibela Cross
 Refugees’ Medal
 Emperor Haile Selassie I & Empress Menen Celebration Medal
 Centenary of the Victory of Adwa Medal
 Medal of Scholarship
 Royal Medal of the Lion
Purple Heart
Medal for Defence of the Country

Socialist Ethiopia (1974-1991)

Order of the Grand Star of Honour of Socialist Ethiopia 
Notable recipients include:

 Fidel Castro (1978)
Kim Il-sung
Kim Jong-il
Leonid Brezhnev (1980)

References 

Orders, decorations, and medals of Ethiopia